Ophiodothella is a genus of fungi in the family Phyllachoraceae.

Distribution
It is has a cosmopolitan distribution, found in the North and South America, Asia and Australia.

Species
As accepted by Species Fungorum;

Ophiodothella angustissima 
Ophiodothella arengae 
Ophiodothella atromaculans 
Ophiodothella balansae 
Ophiodothella bignoniacearum 
Ophiodothella calami 
Ophiodothella calamicola 
Ophiodothella caseariae 
Ophiodothella cuervoi 
Ophiodothella cyclobalanopsidis 
Ophiodothella edax 
Ophiodothella ferruginea 
Ophiodothella fici 
Ophiodothella floridana 
Ophiodothella galophila 
Ophiodothella lagerstroemiae 
Ophiodothella leptospora 
Ophiodothella leucospila 
Ophiodothella liebenbergii 
Ophiodothella longispora 
Ophiodothella neurophila 
Ophiodothella orchidearum 
Ophiodothella palmicola 
Ophiodothella panamensis 
Ophiodothella paraguariensis 
Ophiodothella ruprechtiae 
Ophiodothella sydowii 
Ophiodothella syzygii 
Ophiodothella tithoniae 
Ophiodothella trichocarpa 
Ophiodothella ulei 

Former species;
 O. circularis  = Ophiodothella calamicola
 O. ingae  = Diatractium ingae
 O. tarda  = Sphaerulina tarda
 O. vaccinii  = Ophiodothella angustissima

References

External links
Index Fungorum

Sordariomycetes genera
Phyllachorales